The U.S. state of New Hampshire has several official symbols.

Insignia

Species

Geology

Culture

References

New Hampshire
State symbols